Cerconota phaeophanes is a moth of the family Depressariidae. It is found in Colombia.

The wingspan is 24–27 mm. The forewings are bronzy-fuscous with three very faint darker transverse lines, the first two hardly curved, the first from one-fourth of the costa to the middle of the dorsum, the second from the middle of the costa to three-fourths of the dorsum, the third irregularly curved from three-fourths of the costa to the dorsum before the tornus. The second discal stigma is dark fuscous and located on the second line. The hindwings are dark fuscous.

References

Moths described in 1912
Cerconota
Taxa named by Edward Meyrick